The Samar Island Natural Park, in Samar, is the largest contiguous tract of old-growth forest in the Philippines. The buffer is spread north to south over the island's three provinces (Eastern Samar, Northern Samar and Samar province) and totals , about a third of the entire island of Samar.

The park includes some of the island's well-known natural landmarks and landscapes which have been earlier designated for protection, namely the former Sohoton Natural Bridge National Park, the former Calbiga Caves Protected Landscape, the former Taft Forest Wildlife Sanctuary, the former Jicontol Watershed Forest Reserve and the former Bulosao Watershed Forest Reserve. It has a large biodiversity. It is a center of plant and animal diversity and endemism in the Philippines containing a number of threatened species belonging to the Eastern Visayas and Mindanao biogeographic region.

Geography

The Samar Island Natural Park occupies the low rugged central mountain range of the island of Samar shared by all three provinces in the island. It extends from the Northern Samar municipalities of Catubig, 
Las Navas, Lope de Vega, Mondragon and Silvino Lobos in the north to the Eastern Samar municipalities of Arteche, Balangiga, Balangkayan, Borongan, Can-avid, Dolores, General MacArthur, Giporlos, Hernani, Jipapad, Lawaan, Llorente, Maslog, Maydolong, Oras, Quinapondan, San Julian, Sulat and Taft; and the Samar Province municipalities of Basey, Calbayog, Calbiga, Catbalogan, Gandara, Hinabangan, Jiabong, Marabut, Matuguinao, Motiong, Paranas, Pinabacdao, San Jorge and 
San Jose de Buan in the island's central and southern regions.

The headwaters of 25 watersheds begin from the slopes in the natural park.

The natural park consists of an interior highland with marked accordant peaks and a surrounding limestone or karst terrain. In the southern portion, the landscape is composed of jungle-covered limestone ridges. Its geology is mostly Miocene and Holocene with a sedimentary formation consisting of basement rocks and overlying clastic rocks or limestone. Its ecosystems include grasslands, agroforestry areas, forest-over-limestone, riparian ecosystem, lowland mixed dipterocarp forest, and mossy or cloud forest.

The park is a known habitat of the Philippine eagle. It also has a significant population of the Philippine eagle-owl, Philippine tarsier, Philippine flying lemur and Philippine tree squirrel. It was declared a forest reserve in 1996 but raised to the status of natural park in 2003.

Sohoton Natural Bridge Park
The Sohoton Natural Bridge Park is a conservation area and ecotourism site in the municipality of Basey known for its geological features including its natural stone bridge which connects two mountain ridges across a gorge, and an extensive cave system with unique limestone formations.

Calbiga Caves Park
The Langun-Gobingob cave system is in the natural park. It is considered the biggest cave in the Philippines.

Taft Forest
In the municipality of Taft, Eastern Samar,  of rainforest have been protected as a wildlife sanctuary since 1999. The area is a known nesting site and natural habitat of the critically endangered Philippine eagle. The endemic giant forest raptor was first spotted in the island in the municipality of Paranas on June 15, 1856, by the British explorer John Whitehead.

Jicontol Forest
It is a component of the Mounts Cabalantian-Capotoan Complex, an important bird area, which comprises the mountains of central Samar at the border of Eastern Samar and Samar provinces. This forest is home to many threatened and restricted-range species of the Mindanao and Eastern Visayas Endemic Bird Area, such as the Samar hornbill, Visayan broadbill and yellow-breasted tailorbird. There have also been sightings of the Southern silvery kingfisher and the Philippine eagle in the forest.

Bulosao Watershed
The Bulosao watershed reserve in the forests of the southern Samar mountain range adjacent to the MacArthur mountains was established in 1992 to preserve and maintain the usefulness of the Bulosao River as a source of water for domestic use and irrigation of the municipalities of Marabut and Lawaan.

Flora

Fauna

Threats

References

 
Protected areas established in 1996
Protected areas established in 2003
Geography of Samar (province)
Geography of Eastern Samar
Geography of Northern Samar
Birdwatching sites in the Philippines